Golden Oldies is a South Korean music program for the middle-aged, who wish to sing along and dance to the nostalgic tunes reminiscent of memorable past. The program presented by Kim Dong-gun is aired every Monday at 22:00 KST on KBS 1TV.

Summary 
A music program aimed at middle-aged people to remember nostalgia and memories while singing songs and trots.
Golden Oldies is a representative music program boasting the tradition and authority that has introduced numerous famous songs that penetrate the modern and music history of Korea for 34 years since its first broadcast on 4 November 1985. Until today, during a total of 1572 broadcasts, about 23,000 singers appeared and 28,000 songs were sung. With special performances from around the world for not only domestic but also overseas compatriots from Brazil, Germany, Libya, etc., it has played a role as a channel of communication in life, comforting the longing for hometown and parents, easing the sorrows of the nation, and so on. The theme is decided for each episode, and famous singers sing old songs that fit the song.

Airtime

Past hosts

Previous bandmasters  
The KBS Orchestra is active as an exclusive orchestra for the  < Workers' Festival > and < Mil-yang Arirang Song Festival >, including the music stage, < Open Concert >, < Who is good at >.

The birth of Golden Oldies 
PD Cho Eui-jin, who was in charge of a variety program called <The March of Youth> on KBS 1TV, said, "Let's make a music program targeting the middle-aged in the era of music show programs targeting young people." I think. At that time, KBS President Park Hyun-tae said, "The music stage should consist of good lyrics, enthusiastic singers, and a classy stage." I asked. In line with this direction of production, a program called a music stage was created. One week before the first recording, PD Cho Eui-jin thought that Kim Dong-gun announcer was the foremost of the person who is doing the classy and savvy progress. I went to the announcer Kim Dong-gun and said, "I have a program like this, but can't you help me?" I asked for a request, but I refused it under the ground. When announcer Kim Dong-gun refused until the day before the recording, PD Cho Eui-jin said that he was ignorant. The reason for refusing was Kim Dong-Geon in the special feature of the 30th anniversary of the music stage, "PD Jo Eui-jin is a very, very expensive person. So he asked me to continue to come and watch the society, so I was doing a liberal arts program at that time, Eun-mak, I thought that young people were dancing, so I said that I didn't fit with me. I lasted for a week. Then (PD Jo Eui-jin) "I'll just do one day of recording today, and then after one day, from next week, then I'll find someone else. "Let's see." Go... So I couldn't do it because I was a punk. But... After that, after recording, PD Jo came down and said, "Brother, how does it feel to record it now?" I said, "Hey! I will continue with this program."

History of Golden Oldies 

1987 Libya Encouragement of workers at the Daesu reactor construction: When preparing to go to Libya for the performance, singer 'Hyeon-cheol' was in a group called 'Hyeon-cheol and the bees'. When <Sit but Stand or Think of You>, which I wrote for my wife, became a hit, I made people in Libya think of their homeland and family. However, even though I know the song, the singer is a faceless singer, so I wanted to know who the singer was and wanted to see it. There was a request that the singer wished to come when performing Libya. Kim Dong-gun said he wanted to know who 'Hyeon-cheol', the protagonist of the song, was called. We got on the plane to Libya, but the host announcer Kim Dong-gun saw 'Hyeon-cheol' (singer) and said, "Who is this person? He said that he misunderstood'Hyeon-cheol (singer)' as a worker going to the Libya aqueduct. And since the broadcast,'Hyeon-cheol (singer)', who was a faceless singer, has his face engraved on the people. Hyun-cheol became a popular singer, and in 1989 he won the KBS Music Awards for <Bongseon-hwa Yeonjeong> (Kim Dong-chan lyrics/Park Hyun-jin composition/Hyun-cheol song). Since then, Hyeon-cheol enjoyed the honor of winning the KBS Music Awards for two years in a row with < I Hate Hate> (Lyrics Ho-Seop Lee/Sung Hoon Park/Hyun-Cheol] Song) in 1990.

In 1988, in the United States Los Angeles, he sang <Hometown Elementary>, <San Francisco>, and <Travel Car>. In the year, Jang Se-jeong remade his <Hometown Cho>.

Song of Golden Oldies 
Composer Jeong Pung-song has added lyrics and songs, and has been positioned as a symbol of Golden Oldies from 4 November 1985 until now, and is performing short arrangements with the opening and ending titles of the broadcast .

Song:

Korean:

Overseas tour  
source:
 1987: Libya Encouragement of workers for the construction of a waterway 
 1988: US Los Angeles Performance
 1990: Japan Osaka A performance at the International Flower and Greenery Fair
 1993: Germany Celebrating the 30th anniversary of the miner at the Castrop Raoxel European Hall performance
 1994: Brazil São Paulo Korean consolation performance
 1996: Japan Tokyo Yoyogi Performance for the 50th anniversary of the founding of the 1st Gymnasium
 2013: A performance in commemoration of the 50th anniversary of the dispatch of workers to the Ruhr Congress Hall in Germany and the 130th anniversary of diplomatic relations between Germany and Germany
 2016: Brazil Performance for the 50th anniversary of immigration

Award winning 
 2013 < KBS Entertainment Awards> Special Program Award (Germany Performance)

Past crew

Producer  
source:
 Kang Young-won (2018 ~ 2020 July 6)
 Kim Kwang-soo (formerly responsible producer)
 Park Tae-ho
 Park Hwan-wook
 Park Hyo-Gyu (2017 ~ June 2019)
 Yang Dong-il
 Lee Jae-woo 
 Joh Sung-Sook (Former Producer)
 Joh Sung-ho (2015 ~ March 2019)
 Joh Hyun-ah (formerly responsible producer)
 Chae Hyung-seok 
 Han Ho-Seop (March 2019 ~ 2019 October 28)

Past performers  
 Episode 1684 (2021.01.11.) : [Hope 2021] Song Dae-kwan, Kim Hye-yeon, Lee Hae-ri, Jung Da-han, Hyun Sook, Moon Jeong-seon, Park Goon, Sung Eun, Park Ku-yoon, Kim Na-hee, Lee Do-jin, Park Se-bin, Yun Tae-kyu, Park Hye-sin, Kim Sung-gi, Johnny Lee, Bae Il-ho
 Episode 1683 (2021.01.04.) : [With Stars] Kim Yon-ja, Sul Woon-do, Yoon Hang-ki, In Soon-i, Park Jin-young, Rain, Ha Choon-hwa 
 Episode 1682 (2020.12.28.) : [Songs requested in Dec.] Yang Soo-kyung, Shin Yu, Choi jin-hee, Jung Da-han, Lim Hyun-jung, 3ChongSa, Jo Jung-min, Moon Hee-ok, Song Hyuk, Bae Geum-sung, Kim Seong-hwan, The Barberettes 
 Episode 1681 (2020.12.21.) : [A song to you] Park Jae-ran , Ha Choon-hwa, Sul Woon-do, Woo Yeon-yi, Choi Young-chol, Joo Hyun-mi, Jo Myeong-seop, Ryu ki-jin, Jin Sung, Hae Soo, Ha Dong-geun, Lee Man-young, Tae Jin-ah
 Episode 1680 (2020.12.14.) : [When the time passes] Seo Ji-o, Park Woo-cheol, Lee Eun-ha, Chae Yoon(Lee Chae-yoon), Yoon Soo-hyun, Hyun-sook, Park Jin-gwang, Lee Ae-ran, Jang Gye-hyeon, Doo Ri, Ryu Ji-kwang, Jo Jung-min, Jo Hang-jo
 Episode 1679 (2020.12.07.) : [Two letters(A song with a two letter title.)] Jung Su-ra, Choi Jin-hee, Woo Yeon-yi, Heo Min-young, Park Yoon-kyeong, Kim Sang-bae, Kim Hee-jin, Song Yoo-kyung, Kim Yong-im, Wink, Choi You-na, Kim Si-a, Haeeunlee
 Episode 1678 (2020.11.30.) : [Songs requested in Nov.] Song Dae-kwan, Jang Yoon-jeong, Jin Seong, Kang Hye-yeon, Bae Il-ho, Shin Yu, MOON, Lee Do-jin, Kim Hye-yeon, Ko Il-seok, Sejinee, Lee Ja-yeon, James King
 Episode 1677 (2020.11.16.) : [Love Songs of Memories] Hyun Cheol, Jang Eun-sook, Park Il-nam, Lee Jung-hee, Park Gu-yoon, Choo Ga-yeol, Joo Mi, Nam Hwa-yong, So Yu-chan, So Yu-mi, Lee Dae-heon, Kim Na-hee, Kim Chung-hun, Choi Jin-hee
 Episode 1676 (2020.11.09.) : [Landscape of Love] Sul Woon-do, Jang Yoon-jeong, Shin Yu, Ryu Won-jeong, Kim Yon-ja, Kim Beom-ryong, Woo Soon-sil, Jo Jung-min, Moon Yeon-ju, Moon Hee-ok, Jeong Jeong-a, Hyun Dang, Kim Kook-hwan
 Episode 1675 (2020.11.02.) : [Family of Love] Kim Hye-yeon, Shin Sung, Kang Min-ju, Bae Il-ho, Woo Yeon-yi, Jo Myeong-seop, Seol Ha-soo, Kim Soo-chan, Kang Ye-seul, Hee Seung-yeon, Yoon Ho, Lee Chae-yoon, Hong Min, Ryu Ji-gwang, Geum Jan-di, Bae Geum-seong, Han Sang-il
 Episode 1674 (2020.10.26.) : [Songs requested in Oct.] Kim Yong-im, Kwon Seong-hee, Heo Cham, Maijin, Kim Yang, Kim Dong-a, Shin Soo-ah, Han Hye-jin, Son Bin, Ahn Sung-hoon, Ban Ga-hee, Lim Hee-suk, So Ymeong + Kim Jeong-ho, Song Ga-in
 Episode 1673 (2020.10.23.) : [Nostalgic Hearts] Kim Soo-hee, Jin Seong, Ha Yoon-ju, Shin Hyo-beom, Jo Jung-min, Jang Yoon-jeong, Joo Mi, Jo Hang-jo, Han Ga-bin, Kim Eun-hye, Kim Min-hee, Tae Jin-ah, Lee Do-jin
 Episode 1672 (2020.10.12.) : [Autumn Fall] Kim Sang-hee, Choi Jin-hee, Hyun-sook, Kim Na-hee, Woo Yeon-yi, Lee Mi-bae, Lim Soo-jeong, Park Kang-soo, Moon Hee-ok, Jeong Da-han, Han Young-ju, Lee Jung-ok, Yong Yong, Park Geon
 Episode 1671 (2020.10.05.) : [Composers Baek Young-ho] Han Hye-jin, Jo Joong-seop, Ryu Ji-gwang, Moon Yeon-ju, Joo Young-guk, Romina Alexandra Follinus, Ryu Won-jung, Yu Ji-na, Park Hye-shin, Nam Il-hae, Shin Sung, Kim Soo-chan, Jang Eun-suk, Shin Yu
 Episode 1670 (2020.09.28.) : [Songs requested in Sept.] Jeong Su-ra, Hyun Cheol, Kim Yong-im, Oh Seung-geun, Kang Hye-yeon, Moon, Jin Si-mon, Ban Ga-hee, Hwang Min-woo, Jo Jung-min, Jang Hyun, Kim Seong-gi, Song Dae-gwan, Bae Geum-seong
 Episode 1669 (2020.09.21.) : [My Songs] Park Jae-ran, Jin Seong, Hong Jin-young, Sul Woon-do , Choi Jin-hee , Joo Hyun-mi , Jo Hang-Jo, Yoo Ji-na, Tae Jin-ah, Choi Yoo-na , Park Seo-jin , Woo Yeon-yi , Ha Chun-hwa
 Episode 1668 (2020.09.14.) : [My Songs] Bae Il-ho, Kim Yong-im, Park Gu-yoon, Wink, Park Gun, Park Woo-cheol, Geum Jandi, Jin Hae-sung, Kim Hee-jin, Lee Hye-ri(Trot singer), Shin Seung-tae, Song Yu-kyung, Jung Da-han, Hyun-sook
 Episode 1667 (2020.09.07.) : [River] Nam Sang-gyu, Moon Hee-ok, Jumi, Lee Dae-heon, Jo Myeong-seop, Punggeum, Lee Yong-ju, Kim Hye-yeon, Goo Na-woon, Maijin, Kim Kuk-hwan

References

External links 
 KBS Golden Oldies website
 

Korean Broadcasting System original programming
Korean-language television shows
K-pop television series
South Korean music television shows
South Korean variety television shows
Trot (music)